Carlos "Bebe" Royer (1874 – death date unknown) was a Cuban baseball pitcher in the Cuban League and Negro leagues. He played from 1892 to 1910 with several Cuban ballclubs. He was elected to the Cuban Baseball Hall of Fame in 1939.

External links

Cuban Baseball Hall of Famers

1874 births
Year of death missing
Azul (baseball) players
Cuban Stars (West) players
Baseball pitchers
Cuban expatriate baseball players in the United States